Jamuna Television, commonly known as Jamuna TV, stylized as jamuna|tv, is a privately owned Bangladeshi satellite and cable news and current affairs television channel. It is owned by the Jamuna Group, and was founded by the company's founder and former chairman Nurul Islam Babul in 2014. The channel's headquarters are located in the Jamuna Future Park Complex at Progoti Shoroni in Baridhara.In YouTube, it's the second most subscribed bangladeshi youtube channel after SOMOY TV.

History 
In 2002, Jamuna Television was granted an NOC certificate to broadcast for five years. They were given rights to broadcast both on terrestrial and satellite television. In 2005, without explanation, the BNP-led government revoked its broadcasting rights, and after the High Court permitted Jamuna Television to broadcast, the government appealed against the decision. 

Although its certificate had been expired by then, the original channel began test broadcasting on 15 October 2009. The BTRC shut the channel down on 19 November after the channel had allegedly been broadcasting illegally. However, on 29 July 2013, the channel was once again granted a license to relaunch. Jamuna Television was officially launched on 5 April 2014. British foreign correspondent Simon Dring, who was previously the managing director of Ekushey Television, joined the channel as a staff member.

Jamuna Television was one of the nine Bangladeshi television channels to sign an agreement with Bdnews24.com to subscribe to a video-based news agency run by children called Prism in May 2016. In December 2018, journalists working for Jamuna Television and Jugantor were attacked in the Nawabganj upazila of Dhaka, injuring 10 people. Jamuna Television was temporarily taken off-air during the 2018 Bangladeshi general election.

In January 2019, three journalists working for Jamuna Television were assaulted by eight to ten people in a rehabilitation center in Bogra. Police have arrested three suspects allegedly involved in the incident. On 19 May 2019, Jamuna Television, along with five other channels, began broadcasting via the Bangabandhu-1 satellite after signing an agreement with BSCL. On 5 March 2022, Fahim Ahmed was appointed as the CEO of Jamuna Television.

Controversies 
In 2015, telecommunications company Grameenphone filed a defamation case against Jamuna Television and Jugantor for publishing 'fake' news against the company. Later in 2018, another case was filed against the two entities by the conglomerate PRAN-RFL Group for similar reasons. They were also sued by Robi and the National Board of Revenue.

See also
 List of television stations in Bangladesh
 Telecommunications in Bangladesh
 Media of Bangladesh

References

External links
 

Jamuna Group
Television channels in Bangladesh
Mass media in Dhaka
Television channels and stations established in 2014
24-hour television news channels in Bangladesh
2014 establishments in Bangladesh